Chagrin Falls Township is a township located in Cuyahoga County, Ohio, United States. As of the 2020 census, the township had a total population of 4,317, which includes the village of Chagrin Falls. The portion of the township outside the village limits had a population of 129 at the 2020 census. It is one of only two civil townships remaining in Cuyahoga County (the other being Olmsted Township) and the only Chagrin Falls Township statewide.

Geography 
Located in the eastern part of the county, it borders the following villages and townships:
 Russell Township, Geauga County - northeast
 Chagrin Falls - southeast
 Moreland Hills - west

According to the United States Census Bureau, the incorporated and unincorporated areas of the township have a total area of 2.6 sq mi, all land.

Government
The township is governed by a three-member board of trustees, who are elected in November of odd-numbered years to a four-year term beginning on the following January 1. Two are elected in the year after the presidential election and one is elected in the year before it. There is also an elected township fiscal officer, who serves a four-year term beginning on April 1 of the year after the election, which is held in November of the year before the presidential election. Vacancies in the fiscal officership or on the board of trustees are filled by the remaining trustees. , the board is composed of chairperson Tom Florkiewicz and members John Finley and Jen McKee, and the fiscal officer is Beth Boles.

References

External links
 Township website
 County website

Townships in Cuyahoga County, Ohio
Townships in Ohio